Glasgow Woodside was a parliamentary constituency of the House of Commons of the Parliament of the United Kingdom from 1950 until 1974.

The constituency was preceded by the Labour held St Rollox, which was composed of the Glasgow City Council wards of Cowcaddens and Woodside. The seat was extended to include North Kelvin Ward, which had been part of Glasgow Maryhill.  The name was changed to reflect the new central area of the constituency, which was Woodside.

On the new boundaries, and following a national swing, Glasgow Woodside was narrowly gained by the Conservatives in 1950.

In 1955, Cowcaddens Ward was moved to Glasgow Central while Partick East Ward was gained from Glasgow Hillhead, culminating in an increased Conservative majority of over 4000 in that year.

Despite a national swing to the Tories in the 1959 general election, there was a swing to Labour in Scotland, and four Conservative held seats fell to Labour (Ayrshire Central, Glasgow Craigton, Glasgow Scotstoun and Lanark). The pro-Labour swing saw the Conservative majority in Glasgow Woodside cut in half.

In a 1962 by election, Glasgow Woodside fell to Labour (seeing the return of Neil Carmichael), and was retained by Labour in 1964 and 1966.

Despite winning 7 of the 9 council seats in the constituency, the Conservatives narrowly failed to regain the seat in 1970.

In February 1974, Glasgow Woodside was abolished in name.  In fact post Feb 1974 Glasgow Kelvingrove became a combination of 100% of Glasgow Woodside and part of the old Glasgow Kelvingrove (the rest of which was absorbed by Glasgow Central).  The Woodside MP Neil Carmichael became the MP for the new Kelvingrove, while the old Kelvingrove MP (Maurice Miller) stood in the new East Kilbride seat which had been formed from much of Lanark.

In 1983, Glasgow Kelvingrove was more or less equally divided between Glasgow Hillhead and Glasgow Maryhill. Neil Carmichael stood and lost against the SDP MP for Hillhead, Roy Jenkins.

Boundaries
In the Initial Review of 1944–1947, the boundaries of Glasgow Woodside were described as;

That portion of the City which is bounded by a line commencing at a point at the intersection of the centre lines of Maryhill Road and Oran Street; thence south-eastward along the centre of Maryhill Road to the centre of Bilsland Drive; thence north-eastward along the centre of Bisland Drive to a point in line with the western boundary of Ruchill Hospital; thence southward to and along the line of the western boundary of Ruchill Hospital; thence eastward and southward along the southern and western boundaries of Ruchill Hospital to the centre of Panmure Street; thence westward along the centre of Panmure Street to a point in line with the eastern boundary of Firhill Iron Works; thence southward to and along the eastern boundary of Firhill Iron Works and in continuation thereof to the centre of the Forth and Clyde Canal (Glasgow Branch); thence southward along the centre line of the Forth and Clyde Canal to a point in line with Corn Street; thence westward to and along the centre line of Corn Street to the centre of Garscube Road; thence northward along the centre of Garscube Road to the centre of North Woodside Road; thence northwestward along the centre of North Woodside Road to the centre of St George's Road; thence south-westward along the centre of St George's Road to the centre of Great Western Road; thence northwestward along the centre line of Great Western Road to the centre of the River Kelvin; thence southward along the centre line of the River Kelvin to a point in the line with prolongation of University Avenue; thence westward to and along the centre of University Avenue to the centre of Ashton Road; thence north-westward along the centre of Ashton Road to the centre of Byers Road; thence north-eastward along the centre of Byers Road and Queen Margaret Drive to the centre of the River Kelvin; thence north-westward and north-eastward along the centre line of the River Kelvin to a point in line with the centre line of Kelbourne Street; thence south-eastward to and along the centre line of Kelbourne Street to the centre of Sanda Street; thence north-eastward along the centre lines of Sanda Stree and Oran street to the point of commencement.  

In the First Periodical Review into boundaries published in 1953–4, the boundaries of Glasgow Woodside were described as;

The North Kelvin, Partick East and Woodside wards

Members of Parliament

Election results

Elections in the 1950s

Elections in the 1960s

Election in the 1970s

References 

Historic parliamentary constituencies in Scotland (Westminster)
Constituencies of the Parliament of the United Kingdom established in 1950
Constituencies of the Parliament of the United Kingdom disestablished in 1974
Politics of Glasgow